Stigmella confusella is a moth of the family Nepticulidae. It is found from Fennoscandia to the Pyrenees, Alps and Bulgaria and from Ireland to central Russia.

The wingspan is 5–6 mm. The head is ochreous-yellow. Antennal eyecaps whitish. Forewings fuscous, faintly purplish tinged, especially posteriorly ; a hardly oblique whitish fascia at 2/3 ; outer half of cilia whitish. Hindwings light grey. Adults are on wing in May. There is one generation per year.

The larvae feed on Betula species, including Betula nana, Betula pendula and Betula pubescens. They mine the leaves of their host plant. The mine consists of a long and slender gallery. The corridor follows veins over long distances.

References

External links
bladmineerders.nl
UKmoths
Swedish moths
 Stigmella confusella images at  Consortium for the Barcode of Life
 

Nepticulidae
Moths described in 1894
Moths of Europe
Taxa named by Thomas de Grey, 6th Baron Walsingham
Taxa named by John Henry Wood